Rama is a First Nations community on the Chippewas of Rama First Nation reserve in Ontario, Canada. It is the home of Casino Rama.

The community sports complex is called the Mnjikaning Arena Sports Ki, which was the home arena of the Couchiching Terriers ice hockey team, once affiliated with the Barrie Colts. The Rama Kings lacrosse team also plays at the MASK.

The Ontario Provincial Police provides dispatching services for the community, but the officers who police the town of Rama are members of the Rama Police Service (formerly the Mnjikaning Police Service).

External links
Rama First Nation

Communities in Simcoe County
Anishinaabe reserves in Ontario